Kharipukuria is a village in Contai III CD block in Contai subdivision of Purba Medinipur district in the state of West Bengal, India.

Geography

Location

Urbanisation
93.55% of the population of Contai subdivision live in the rural areas. Only 6.45% of the population live in the urban areas and it is considerably behind Haldia subdivision in urbanization, where 20.81% of the population live in urban areas.

Note: The map alongside presents some of the notable locations in the subdivision. All places marked in the map are linked in the larger full screen map.

Demographics
As per 2011 Census of India Kharipukuria had a total population of 2,470 of which 0 (0%) were males and 2,470 (100%) were females. Population below 6 years was 257. The total number of literates in Kharipukuria was 2,069 (93.49% of the population over 6 years).

Transport
Kharipukuria is off National Highway 116B, locally popular as Digha Road.

Healthcare
Kharipukuria Block Primary Health Centre at Kharipukuria, PO Nachinda Bazar (with 10 beds) is the main medical facility in Contai III CD block. There are primary health centres at Banamalichatta (with 10 beds), Bhaitgarh (with ? beds) and Deulbarh (with 2 beds).

References

Villages in Purba Medinipur district